Jennifer, Jenifer, Jenny, or Jennie Lewis may refer to:

Jenny Lewis, American musician
Jenny Lewis (Primeval), fictional character
Jenny Lewis (Royal Navy officer), first female Royal Navy pilot killed in action
Jennie Lewis (actress) (known professionally as Dagmar), American actress, model, and television personality
Jennie Lewis (artist), American printmaker
Jennifer A. Lewis, Harvard University professor
Jenifer Lewis, American actress